Bukit Batok, often abbreviated as Bt Batok, is a planning area and matured residential town located along the eastern boundary of the West Region of Singapore. Bukit Batok statistically ranks in as the 25th largest, the 12th most populous and the 11th most densely populated planning area in the Republic. It is bordered by six other planning areas - Choa Chu Kang to the North, northeast and northwest, Cashew to the northeast and east, Clementi to the south, Bukit Timah to the southeast, Jurong East to the southwest and Tengah to the west.

Bukit Batok largely sits on Gombak norite, a geological formation that is found in high concentrations within the planning area itself, as well as in the western parts of neighbouring Cashew. It was this presence of the igneous rock that made Bukit Batok a pivotal location for the quarrying industry in Singapore around the turn of the mid-20th century.

Etymology
Many differing accounts describe the origin of the name Bukit Batok. Bukit means "hill" in Malay, thus the name of the town gives the impression of it being hilly. Batok, however, has several interpretations.

One version, according to a Javanese village chief of the village Gassing, that coconut trees grew in the hilly area and hence the area was named batok, the Javanese term for coconuts.

The Chinese version is that the hills of solid granite, which is called batu in Malay, and then subsequently misnamed as bato and then finally batok. Another version was that hill looks like a human skull top and the words skull top was pronounced as batok.

Others believe that batok, the Malay word for cough, is linked to the place either because of its cool air (causing coughs and colds), or due to the sound of explosives historically used at its granite quarry, Little Guilin.

History 
1928: Bukit Batok was heavily dominated by rubber and pineapple plantations.

1940: At the start of the 1940s, industrialization began to gradually occur in Bukit Timah. Ford factory was one of the first factories to be built along Bukit Timah road near the current day’s site.

WWII: In the early stages of the South-East Asian Theatre of World War II, Bukit Batok became a significant ground for both the Allied and Axis powers. The failed attempt by the British to defend the vicinity during the Battle of Bukit Timah and their subsequent surrender on 15 February 1942 to the Japanese at the Ford Motor Factory in present-day Hillview subzone was described by Winston Churchill as the "largest capitulation" in British military history. Singapore consequently underwent four years of Japanese occupation, which eventually ended following Operation Tiderace in early-September 1945.

Consequently, the British’s plans to industrialize Bukit Timah was short-lived and put to an abrupt halt during World War II. The factories that were built before 1942 were swiftly taken over by the Japanese during their occupation of Singapore. Ford Factory, which sits at the bottom of the Bukit Batok Hill, was occupied by Nissan, the Japanese Multination Corporation, to supply military vehicles for the Imperial Japanese Army Force. Both Bukit Batok hill (current day Bukit Batok Nature Park) and Bukit Timah hill were considered as strategic hill grounds (Figure 6) during the Japanese Occupation. These locations were key to controlling the surrounding areas and thus were the site of the fiercest battles of the war. In addition, Bukit Timah Hill was also the British Commonwealth’s last line of defence against the Imperial Japanese Army Force.

The Syonan Chureito Shrine

Following the successful conquest of Singapore, General Yamashita ordered 500 Australian Prisoners of War to construct the Japanese war memorial, Syonan Chureito shrine, at the top of Bukit Batok Hill. Throughout the Japanese Occupation, the Japanese officials and military personnel would frequently worship their emperor in the Syonan Chureito shrine. In addition, footages of these ceremonies would be broadcast as propaganda in Japan to ensure the citizens’ continuous support for the war. However, the shrine was ultimately destroyed by the Japanese themselves at the end of the World War II as they feared that the honour of the memorial would be tarnished by the returning British troops.

Post-War: After World War II, the British returned to Singapore. The areas around Ford Factory became known as the British’s ‘colonial estate factories’ as the British resumed their plans to industrialize Bukit Timah.
In addition to the development of factories, Bukit Timah began to be extensively quarried for granite. The Poh Kim Quarry, which lies in the heart of Bukit Batok Nature Park today, was one of the quarry sites in the vicinity. It was quarried for granite between the 1950s to the 1970s but was later abandoned due to the damage that the activities was causing to the earth’s core.

1965-1975: After Singapore gained independence in 1965, the newly formed People’s Action Party (PAP) government aggressively promoted the site as a lightweight industrial area. 
 
1975-: Development of Bukit Batok New Town began in December 1975, transforming the former quarrying village into a self-sustainable new town in the rough span of a decade. As a testament to its heritage, several norite formations and ridges remained preserved, most of which can be found at both Bukit Batok Nature Park and Bukit Batok Town Park as a characteristic feature of the modern-day town.

Earthworks to build Bukit Batok started in 1979. The first HDB estates with blocks numbered Blk 2xx were completed in 1983, followed by 1xx and 6xx in 1985. Subsequently, the blocks at Bukit Gombak were finished in 1987, with Block numbered 3xx ready for occupancy in 1989. Earthworks at Bukit Batok West began later, and is currently being developed. The first set of Blocks numbered 4xx were completed between late 2018 and early 2019 and have since been occupied, with more blocks currently being built in the process.

Geography

Location
Bukit Batok Planning Area is bordered by six other planning areas - Choa Chu Kang to the north and northwest, Bukit Panjang to the northeast and east, Clementi to the south, Bukit Timah to the southeast, Jurong East to the southwest and Tengah to the west.

Bukit Batok New Town is located within Bukit Batok Planning Area.

Subzones
Bukit Batok Planning Area is divided into 9 subzones:

Commercial activities

Bukit Batok's main shopping complex West Mall was opened in mid-1998. Developed by Alprop Pte. Ltd., a joint venture between the United Industrial Corporation (UIC) and Singapore Land, it has 7 storeys in total gross floor area of 283,000 sq ft (26,300 m²) on a land area of 106,000 sq ft (9,800 m²). It was built at a cost of S$170 million and houses amenities including a post office, Community Library and Cineplex, together with shops, restaurants and a supermarket.

Transport

There are two MRT stations in the Bukit Batok area: Bukit Batok MRT station and Bukit Gombak MRT station.

The Bukit Batok Bus Interchange, sited near to Bukit Batok MRT station and West Mall, is of moderate size and nearly completely used by Tower Transit Singapore. The interchange and most of the services were previously operated by Singapore Bus Services (the precursor of SBS Transit), until 26 December 2000, when bus services were transferred to Trans-Island Bus Services (the precursor of SMRT Buses). SMRT Buses remained the operator until 29 May 2016, when only bus services 852 (until 2018, under Seletar Bus Package) and 61 and 991 were left with SMRT Buses. SBS Transit still has a bus depot in Bukit Batok.

Public service and utility 
Bukit Batok has 1 fire station located at 80 Bukit Batok Rd, Singapore 658072. The HDB Branch is located at Bukit Batok Central.

Education
, this area has a total of six primary schools and six secondary schools. These include Princess Elizabeth Primary School, Keming Primary School, Lianhua Primary School, St. Anthony’s Primary School, Bukit View Primary School, Bukit View Secondary School, Bukit Batok Secondary School, Yusof Ishak Secondary School, Hillgrove Secondary School, Dunearn Secondary School and more.

Millennia Institute, formed from the merger of Jurong Institute and Outram Institute, moved to its new campus off Bukit Batok West Avenue 3 in January 2007. Bukit Batok is also home to Singapore Hotel and Tourism Education Centre (SHATEC).

Recreation

The Bukit Batok swimming complex is located off East Avenue 6. There are many parks in the neighborhood, including the Bukit Batok Town Park and the Bukit Batok Nature Park.

The CDANS Bukit Batok Country Club, for reservist members of the Civil Defence forces and their families, was opened in 1998. It offers a golf driving range, swimming pool, bowling alley and sports facilities for relatively affordable prices.

The Civil Service Club Bukit Batok Clubhouse offers swimming, bowling and related recreational facilities to civil servants, their families and the public. It is located near Bukit Batok Town Centre and was opened on 1 March 2006.

Politics
The jurisdiction of Bukit Batok is shared by the Jurong Group Representation Constituency (Jurong GRC), which has an office at Bukit Batok Central and manages much of Bukit Batok; and Chua Chu Kang Group Representation Constituency (Chua Chu Kang GRC), which manages areas north of Bukit Batok West Avenue 3 and Bukit Batok Central. There are four members of Parliament, two from each GRC, representing various areas in Bukit Batok.

Bukit Batok was a single-member constituency by itself prior to the 1991 elections, which was later mainly consolidated into Jurong GRC until in the 2015 elections, where it carved out as a SMC again. As of 2016, Bukit Batok represents in Jurong GRC and Bukit Batok SMC. For Jurong GRC, Bukit Batok East is the only constituency, of which Rahayu Mahzam is the current MP. David Ong, served as an MP for Bukit Batok constituency until his sudden resignation in March 2016; Murali Pillai, a candidate who contested and lost Aljunied GRC in the 2015 elections, has since represented Bukit Batok, following his by-election victory on May 2016.

In the same elections in 2011 and 2015, Bukit Gombak represents in Chua Chu Kang GRC, there are two constituencies also in Bukit Gombak, one of which it is a different system. Bukit Gombak represents as Low Yen Ling MP, while Amy Khor represented Hong Kah North SMC.

References

 
New towns in Singapore
Places in Singapore
New towns started in the 1970s